Mount Bentley is a mountain (4,245 m) standing  north of Mount Anderson in the main western ridge of the Sentinel Range, Antarctica. It was discovered by the Marie Byrd Land Traverse party, 1957–58, and named for Dr. Charles R. Bentley, leader of the traverse party and chief traverse seismologist at Byrd Station, 1957–59.

See also
 Mountains in Antarctica

Maps
 Vinson Massif.  Scale 1:250 000 topographic map.  Reston, Virginia: US Geological Survey, 1988.
 Antarctic Digital Database (ADD). Scale 1:250000 topographic map of Antarctica. Scientific Committee on Antarctic Research (SCAR). Since 1993, regularly updated.

References

Ellsworth Mountains
Mountains of Ellsworth Land
Four-thousanders of Antarctica